Gerardo Daniel Acosta Mateuci (born February 22, 1984) is a Uruguayan football defender currently playing for Sportivo Belgrano of the Primera B Nacional in Argentina.

References
 
 

1984 births
Living people
Footballers from Montevideo
Association football defenders
Uruguayan footballers
Sportivo Cerrito players
Club Nacional de Football players
C.A. Bella Vista players
Centro Atlético Fénix players
San Martín de San Juan footballers
Club Atlético Patronato footballers
Villa Española players
Uruguayan expatriate footballers
Expatriate footballers in Argentina